Euphorbia groenewaldii is a species of flowering plant in the family Euphorbiaceae native to southern Africa. It is listed as endemic to and Critically Endangered in South Africa due to habitat destruction and overcollection. Kew's Plants of the World Online also lists it as native to Mozambique.

References

groenewaldii
groenewaldii
Flora of Africa